Alfonso Teddy Garcia (born June 4, 1964) is a former professional American football player who was a placekicker in the National Football League (NFL) and the World League of American Football (WLAF).

Career
Garcia played college football at Northeast Louisiana University (now the University of Louisiana at Monroe), where he was a member of the team that won the 1987 NCAA Division I-AA Football Championship Game.

Between 1988 and 1992, Garcia played for the New England Patriots, Minnesota Vikings and Houston Oilers of the NFL, and the San Antonio Riders and Barcelona Dragons of the WLAF. In 1999, Garcia played for the Shreveport Knights of the short-lived Regional Football League.

Teddy Garcia now being call to talk about Formula 1 to latin america fans since his name was appointed as future ESPN Formula 1 reporter.

References

1964 births
Living people
American football placekickers
Barcelona Dragons players
Houston Oilers players
Louisiana–Monroe Warhawks football players
Minnesota Vikings players
New England Patriots players
People from Caddo Parish, Louisiana
Players of American football from Louisiana
San Antonio Riders players
New Orleans Night players
Regional Football League players